Daniel Avilés Valiente (born 4 April 2001) is a Spanish actor, best known for his role of Carlitos in the series Los protegidos.

References

External links 

 
 

2001 births
Living people
Spanish male child actors
21st-century Spanish male actors